Rumball is a surname. Notable people with the surname include:

Bob Rumball (1929–2016), Canadian pastor and advocate
Frederick Rumball (1853–1940), Canadian merchant and politician
Lesley Rumball (born 1973), New Zealand netball player
Lucas Rumball (born 1995), Canadian rugby union player
Sylvia Rumball (born 1939), New Zealand scientific research ethicist

See also
Rum ball